Lavon Rydleŭski (14 October 1903 - 24 October 1953) was an active participant in the Belarusian independence movement and anti-Soviet resistance and a prominent member of the Belarusian diaspora.

Early life 
Rydleŭski was born in the village of Uljanavičy, Mogilev province of the Russian Empire (now Viciebsk Region of Belarus).

In 1923 he graduated from the Belarusian Gymnasium in Vilna and in 1929 a polytechnic institute in Poděbrady, Czechoslovakia.

Participation in Belarusian independence movement 
Rydleŭski was one of the youngest combatants in the Slucak Uprising of 1920, an anti-Bolshevik pro-independence military campaign in central Belarus. In 1921 he participated in anti-Soviet armed resistance in the Paleśsie region, southern Belarus.

In exile 
After his studies in Czechoslovakia, Rydleŭski moved to France where he founded and headed the Union of Belarusian Working Emigrants in France.

During World War II, he obtained permission for Belarusians to serve in the French Foreign Legion and participated in the French Resistance.

After the war he published a newspaper "Belarusian News" and became a Vice-President of the Rada of the Belarusian Democratic Republic. In 1948 he was elected the chair of the International Union of Belarusians in Exile.

Death and memory 

Rydleŭski died on 24 October 1953 and is buried in the Hampstead cemetery in London.

On 27 November 2010, an anniversary of the Słucak Uprising, the Association of Belarusians in Great Britain installed a new tombstone on his grave. Rydleŭski's resting place has since been used by the Belarusian community as a meeting place for commemorative events.

References

Further reading 
 3 жыцьця й дзейнасьці М. Абрамчыка // 3 гісторыяй на «Вы». Вып. 3. — Мн., 1994.
 Л. Рыдлеўскі - Гэтак было. Успаміны слуцкага паўстанца // «Спадчына» No. 1, 1997.
 Найдзюк Я., Касяк І. Беларусь учора і сёньня. — Мн.: 1993.

Belarusian diaspora
Belarusian emigrants to France